The Wings for Life World Run is a running competition held on the first weekend of May since 2014 to collect funds for the not-for-profit foundation Wings for Life. The entry fee goes completely to Spinal Cord Research. It became the largest running event in 2021 with 184,236 runners participating in one single event.

The Wings for Life World Run is peculiar in that participants don't have to run a specific distance like in comparable competitions. At the Wings for Life World Run, all participants start at the same time, worldwide. It doesn’t matter whether they are professional athletes, fun runners, total beginners or in a wheelchair. There is no traditional finish line. Instead, a "Catcher Car" pursues and passes the runners and rollers, one after the other either physically at one of the Flagship Runs or virtually with the app, will be caught. That makes it the only race worldwide where everyone finishes. The run is broadcast live on

The Wings for Life Foundation and the Wings for Life World Run 
The not-for-profit foundation Wings for Life was established by the two-time motocross world champion Heinz Kinigadner and the Red Bull founder Dietrich Mateschitz in 2004. Its goal is to find a cure for spinal cord injuries and paraplegia. Therefore, the foundation supports research and studies about spinal cord and spinal cord injuries financially. Anita Gerhardter is CEO. Founder Kinigadner himself is concerned because his brother and his son, both motocross riders too, are in wheelchairs after injuries.

After two years of preparations the first Wings for Life World Run was started on May 4, 2014 to raise funds, at the same time arouse attention on limitations and medical problems of paraplegia. Following the success of the first edition the race is now an annual event. 

The race is open to everybody, professionals as well as members or non-members of running clubs. The entry fee is donated entirely to the foundation, the main sponsor Red Bull covers the costs of the event. The fees vary somewhat depending on the choice of location.Participating is possible in one of the Falgship events or virtually via the Wings for Life World Run app.

The Motto of the race is:

"Running for those who can’t."

"World" Run 
The name Wings for Life World Run comes from the fact that the race takes place around the world at the same time. That means that runners in Europe or Africa run around noon while participants in Asia and Australia in the afternoon or evening. In the Americas the race is early in the morning or even during the night. In 2021, David Kilgore set an American record for the Red Bull Wings for Life World Run.

The "Catcher Car" 
The Wings for Life World Run is outstanding because there is no prescribed distance to cover. Thus runners of very different levels can equally take part.

The last remaining female and male runners worldwide are the Wings for Life World Run Global Champions . The conditions and tracks vary quite a lot. The Catcher Cars are steered precisely using global satellite navigation hence a comparison between the different locations is nonetheless possible. The following table show how fast the car rides at what time after the start and how far it is at each speed change.

References

External links 
 Official website of the foundation
 Official website of the competition

Road running competitions
Fundraising events
Spinal cord
May observances
Dietrich Mateschitz